Vector graphics are a form of computer graphics.

Vector graphic may also refer to:

Vector Graphic, a computer company
Vektor Grafix, UK based computer game development company

See also
 Raster graphics
 Vector (disambiguation)
 Vectorization (disambiguation)